Marcella Bella (born 18 June 1952), also known just as Marcella, is an Italian pop singer. Her brothers Antonio and Salvatore Bella are famous musicians, and her brother Gianni Bella is another popular singer who has composed several songs for her.

Life and career 
She made her record debut in 1969, with the single "Il pagliaccio", using the mononym "Marcella".

Bella got her first success in 1971, with the single "Hai ragione tu". In 1972, she had her breakout taking part in the Sanremo Music Festival  with "Montagne verdi", a semi-autobiographical song penned by her brother Gianni Bella which turned to be a massive commercial hit. She later performed in other musical events, being a finalist in the 1973 edition of Canzonissima with "Un sorriso e poi perdonami", and winning the Festivalbar with "Io domani". Other significant successes of the decade include "Nessuno mai", later covered by Boney M. in an English version titled "Take the Heat off Me" and included in their eponymous album, "Abbracciati", which she presented out of competition at the 1977 Sanremo Festival, and her cover version of Domenico Modugno's canzone napoletana classic "Resta cu'mme". 

After a period of relative tarnish, in the early 1980s Bella began recording under her full name, and achieved an impressive success in 1983 with "Nell'aria", a song penned by Mogol together with her brother Gianni.  Other hits followed across the whole decade, mainly linked to her partecipations to the Sanremo Festival, notably "Senza un briciolo di testa" (third place at Sanremo 1986), "Tanti auguri" (Sanremo 1987), "Dopo la tempesta" (Sanremo 1988) and "Verso l'ignoto" (a duet with Gianni Bella presented at Sanremo 1990). In the 1990s she slowed her activities. In 2004 she ran in the European Parliament election with National Alliance party, being not elected. In 2005, she returned to the Sanremo Festival after a fifteen-year absence with the song "Uomo bastardo", ranking second in the "classics" tournement.

Italian discography

Singles 
1969 Il pagliaccio
1969 Bocca dolce
1971 Hai ragione tu
1972 Montagne verdi
1972 Sole che nasce sole che muore
1972 Un sorriso e poi perdonami
1973 Io domani
1973 Mi...ti...amo
1974 Nessuno mai
1974 L'avvenire
1975 E quando
1975 Negro
1976 Resta cu 'mme
1976 Abbracciati
1977 Non m'importa più
1978 Mi vuoi
1979 Lady anima
1979 Camminando e cantando
1980 Baciami
1981 Pensa per te
1981 Canto straniero
1981 Mi mancherai
1982 Problemi
1983 Nell'aria
1984 Nel mio cielo puro
1985 L'ultima poesia (with Gianni Bella)
1986 Senza un briciolo di testa
1987 Tanti auguri
1988 Dopo la tempesta
1990 Verso l'ignoto (with Gianni Bella)
1998 E' un miracolo (with Gianni Bella)
2002 La regina del silenzio
2007 Forever per sempre
2012 Malecon
2012 Femmina bella

LP, CD 
1972 Tu non-hai la più pallida idea dell'amore
1973 Mi..ti..amo...
1974 Metamorfosi
1975 L'anima dei matti
1976 Bella
1977 Femmina
1979 Camminando e cantando
1981 Marcella Bella
1982 Problemi
1983 Nell'aria
1984 Nel mio cielo puro
1986 Senza un briciolo di testa
1987 Tanti auguri
1988 '88
1990 Canta Battisti
1990 Verso l'ignoto...
1991 Sotto il vulcano
1993 Tommaso!
1995 Anni dorati
1998 Finalmente insieme
2002 Passato e presente
2005 Uomo bastardo
2007 Forever per sempre (with Gianni Bella)
2012 Femmina bella

References

External links 

 
 

1952 births
Living people
Musicians from Catania
20th-century Italian women singers
21st-century Italian women singers